The 1999 Reading Borough Council election was held on 6 May 1999, at the same time as other local elections across Britain. Sixteen of the 45 seats on Reading Borough Council were up for election, being the usual third of the council (15 seats) plus a by-election in Abbey ward, where Labour's Jane Griffiths had resigned her seat on the council.

Labour gained one seat in Abbey ward which had been held by Mohammad Iqbal, who had been elected as a Labour councillor in 1997 but expelled from the party later that year. He had continued to hold his council seat since then as an independent councillor, but did not stand for re-election in 1999. Apart from that change, no other seats changed party in 1999.

Results

Ward results
The results in each ward were as follows:

References

1999 English local elections
1999